Rita B. Garman (born November 19, 1943) is a former American judge who served as a justice of the Supreme Court of Illinois. She represented the Fourth Judicial District on the Supreme Court. She was elected by her peers to serve a three-year term as chief justice from October 26, 2013, to October 25, 2016. Garman announced on May 9, 2022, that she would retire from the Supreme Court on July 7, 2022.  On May 10, 2022, the Illinois Supreme Court announced that Fourth District Appellate Justice Lisa Holder White would be appointed to succeed Garman effective July 8, 2022.

Early life and education
Garman was born in Aurora, Illinois. She was valedictorian of Oswego High School in 1961.

She received her Bachelor of Science degree in economics with highest honors from the University of Illinois in 1965, Bronze Tablet. She earned her Juris Doctor degree with distinction from the University of Iowa College of Law in 1968.

Career
After law school, Garman was briefly employed by the Vermilion County Legal Aid Society. Garman was an assistant state's sttorney in Vermilion County, Illinois from 1969 to 1973. She later briefly worked in private practice with Sebat, Swanson, Banks, Lessen & Garman in 1973.

In 1973, she was appointed an associate judge for the Fifth Judicial Circuit, where she served for twelve years. In 1986, Garman filed to run for the judgeship being vacated by John Meyer. Garman won the general election and succeeded Matthew A. Jurczak, a retired judge and placeholder appointee. She served as the Fifth Circuit's presiding judge from 1987 until her assignment to the appellate court. Claudia Anderson was appointed to succeed Garman as a circuit judge.

Carl A. Lund retired from his position as an appellate justice and Garman was appointed to the appellate bench on July 17, 1995. She was elected to the position in November 1996. She was appointed to the Supreme Court of Illinois on February 1, 2001, and elected to the court on November 5, 2002. Representative John Turner was appointed to succeed Garman on the appellate court.

She was retained by the voters in 2012 for a term that ends in 2022. While on the Supreme Court, Garman also established a special committee on child custody issues and still serves as its liaison.

She is a member of the Vermilion County Bar Association, Illinois Bar Association, and Iowa Bar Association, as well as the Illinois Judges' Association.

See also
List of female state supreme court justices
List of first women lawyers and judges in Illinois

References

External links

1943 births
Living people
21st-century American judges
21st-century American women judges
Chief Justices of the Illinois Supreme Court
Illinois Republicans
Illinois state court judges
Judges of the Illinois Appellate Court
Justices of the Illinois Supreme Court
People from Aurora, Illinois
University of Iowa College of Law alumni
University of Illinois Urbana-Champaign alumni
Women chief justices of state supreme courts in the United States
Women in Illinois politics